Lake Rusałka is an artificial lake in Poznań, Poland with an area of 367,000 square metres.  It was named after the water nymph Rusalka. It was formed in 1943 as a result of the damming of the Bogdanka River. In 1940 thousands of people were executed in the forests surrounding the lake.

Gallery

Poznań
Rusalka
Tourist attractions in Poznań
Rusalka